HMS Hydra was one of 20 Acheron-class destroyers built for the Royal Navy in the 1910s. Completed in 1912, the ship participated in World War I and was sold for scrap in 1921.

Design and description
The Acheron class was a repeat of the preceding . The Admiralty provided general specifications, but each shipyard did their own detailed design so that ships often varied in size. The ships displaced  at deep load and their crew numbered 70 officers and ratings.

Hydra was powered by a single Brown-Curtis steam turbine that drove both propeller shafts using steam provided by three Yarrow boilers.

The primary armament of the ships consisted of a pair of BL  Mk VIII guns in single, unprotected pivot mounts fore and aft of the superstructure. They were also armed with two single QF 12-pounder guns, one on each broadside abreast the bridge. The destroyers were equipped with a pair of single rotating mounts for 21-inch (533 mm) torpedo tubes amidships and carried two reload torpedoes.

Construction and career
Hydra was ordered under the 1910–1911 Naval Programme from John Brown & Company. The ship was laid down at the company's Clydebank shipyard on 7 February 1911, launched on 19 February 1912 and commissioned in June.

The Battle of Dogger Bank
Hydra was with the First Destroyer Flotilla at the Battle of Dogger Bank on 24 January 1915.

The Battle of Jutland
She was present at the Battle of Jutland on 31 May 1916. Along with the rest of the flotilla, she was transferred to the 3rd Battle Squadron, based at Portsmouth.

She collided with a merchant ship on the night of 11 February 1917 in the English Channel. The captain of Hydra was held liable for the collision because, although the other ship showed him a light, he did not perceive that it was on a crossing course.

Mediterranean Service
From 1917 the Third Battle Squadron was deployed to the Mediterranean. Hydra was present at the entry of the Allied Fleet through the Dardanelles on 12 November 1918. On 9 February 1921, Hydra collided with the Royal Navy torpedo boat Z 3 in the Weilingen Channel and sank. Z 3 rescued all 72 of Hydra′s crew.  The ship was sold on 9 May 1921 to Thos. W. Ward of Portishead for scrap.

Pennant Numbers

References

External links 
 Battle of Jutland Crew Lists Project - HMS Hydra Crew List

 

Acheron-class destroyers of the Royal Navy
Ships built on the River Clyde
1912 ships
World War I destroyers of the United Kingdom
Maritime incidents in 1921
Ships sunk in collisions